Inside Jewish Day Schools: Leadership, Learning, and Community is a 2021 book by Alex Pomson and Jack Wertheimer, published by Brandeis University Press. It presents nine case studies of contemporary Jewish day schools and their approaches to learning. The book has been positively reviewed for its broad overview of the trends in 21st Century Jewish education.

References 

2021 non-fiction books
Books about education
Books about Judaism
University Press of New England books